PT-105 was a PT boat of the United States Navy during World War II. The  motor torpedo boat was built by the Elco Motor Yacht Company of Bayonne, New Jersey, in early 1942, and served until the end of the war.

Service history
PT-105 was commissioned in June 1942, as part of Motor Torpedo Boat Squadron 5, under the command of Cdr. Henry Farrow. From September 1942 until early in 1943 she served on the Panama Sea Frontier, when she was transferred to the Solomon Islands. PT-105, under the command of Lt. Richard E. Keresey, was present during the action with Japanese destroyers in the Blackett Strait on the night of 1–2 August 1943, in the aftermath of which Lt.(jg) John F. Kennedy's PT-109 was sunk. On the 22nd of that month, she participated in a daylight raid on the Kolombangara coast that provoked a considerable fight between PT boats and enemy coastal guns. At the end of 1944 MTB Squadron 5 was disbanded and its remaining boats distributed to other squadrons.

On 15 February 1945 PT-105 was transferred to MTB Squadron 18, under the command of Lt. Edward Macauley III, and saw action in New Guinea; at Manus Island in the Admiralties; and at Morotai in the Halmaheras. She was also based for a time at Kana Kopa, New Guinea, and in San Pedro Bay, Philippines, but saw no action there.

The vessel was placed out of service on 1 November 1945, and later stripped and scrapped at Samar, Philippines.

References

Further reading
 

World War II patrol vessels of the United States
105